Paolo Alberto Monachetti (born 24 March 1994), known professionally as Charlie Charles, is an Italian record producer and DJ from Milan. He started his career in 2015, releasing the collaborative album XDVR with rapper Sfera Ebbasta. In 2019, he co-wrote and co-produced the single "Soldi" for Mahmood, which won the 69th Sanremo Musical Festival.

Discography

Collaborative albums

Singles

References

External links 
Charlie Charles on AllMusic

1994 births
Living people
Italian record producers
Italian DJs
Musicians from Milan